Black Anwar (10 July 1941 – 10 November 2007) was a Bangladeshi film and television actor. In 1989 he won Bangladesh National Film Award for Best Actor in Supporting Role for his performance in Byathar Daan.

Career
Anwar debuted his acting career in the film Shuorani Duorani. His last acted film was Kabuliwala.

Works
 Shuorani Duorani (1968)
 Jibon Theke Neya (1970)
 Ananta Prem (1977)
 Byathar Daan (1989)
 Oshanto Dheu
 Shakkhi
 Shoth Bhai
 Kabuliwala (2006)
 Akkel Alir Nirbachon (2008)

References

External links
 

1941 births
2007 deaths
People from Dhaka
Bangladeshi male film actors
Bangladeshi male television actors
Best Supporting Actor National Film Award (Bangladesh) winners